Land of the Gods may refer to:

Greece, in Greek literature and mythology
Land of Punt, by the Ancient Egyptians
Uttarakhand, States of India, on account of the number of Hindu sacred places there